Hetty Naaijkens-Retel Helmrich (Dutch born 1955, Bandoeng) raised in the Netherlands, is the director of Scarabeefilms (Netherlands). She has produced several award-winning documentaries.

Biography
Hetty Naaijkens-Retel Helmrich started her career teaching Dutch language and Social Sciences in the Netherlands and on Curaçao (1979–1987). In 1989 she founded the film production company Scarabeefilms, which grew into an internationally active operation. In April 2004, Hetty Naaijkens-Retel Helmrich received the bi-annual Martha Hering Award for Dutch women in film and media who have actively supported other women in their field.

She made her debut as a director with the self-produced feature-length documentary Contractpensions – Djangan Loepah, which was edited by her son Jasper Naaijkens. The film received Holland's Crystal Film Award for attracting more than 10,000 visitors during its Dutch theatrical release in 2009. Her second feature-length documentary Buitenkampers-the color of survival: (2013) also got the Crystal film award for more than 10,000 tickets sold. In July 2018 she received her third Crystal film award for her film Klanken van Oorsprong/Sounds of Origin.

AWARDS en PRIJZEN

1992 Special Jury Award Best Artist-Profile of the International Golden Gate Film Festival of San Francisco" voor "Moving Objects
1994 Nomination New Media Award Top Television München" voor "Jemand auf der Treppe
2002 Stand van de Zon

    Audience Award Visions du Réel Nyon (Zwitserland)
    Award Prix SRG SSR Idée Suisse
    Grand Prix of the Jury Maremma Doc Festival Pal Mares
    Dutch Academy Award Gouden Beeld Best Documentary
    Audience Award 7th International Film Festival Split (Joegoslavië)

2004 Openingsfilm IDFA met "Stand van de Maan"

    Grand Joris Ivens Award IDFA
    Grand World Documentary Award Sundance Film Festival
    Best Cinematography Award International Documentary Film Festival Chicago
    Openingsfilm International Film Festival Bermuda
    Grand Jury Award Full Frame USA
    Kristallen Prijs Nederland
    Asja.biz Prize - Best Documentary Cinemabiente Environmental Film Festival Turijn
    Audience Award Rencontres Documentary Film Festival Montreal voor "Stand van de Maan"

2006 Grand Golden Dhow Best Documentary Award at the Zanzibar International Film Festival voor "Promised Paradise"
2010 Openingsfilm IDFA met "Stand van de Sterren"

    VPRO/IDFA Grand Jury Award for Best Feature Length Documentary
    Beste Nederlandse Documentaire

2011 Special jury Award World Documentary Sundance
2011 Grand jury Award Abu Dhabi filmfestival
2011 Grand jury Award Durban international filmfestival
2012 Writers Guild of America, USA WGA Award (Screen) [Nominee] (2012)Best Documentary Screenplay Position among the stars/Stand van de Sterren (2010)

External links
 http://www.scarabeefilms.com
 http://www.klankenvanoorsprong.nl

Dutch film producers
Dutch women film producers
Dutch documentary filmmakers
Living people
1955 births